The Bretton Woods Committee is an American organization created in 1983 as a result of the agreement between U.S. Secretary of the Treasury, Henry Fowler, and U.S. Deputy Secretary of the Treasury,  Charls Walker – at the time a Democrat and a Republican, respectively. The agreement they arrived upon was that world leaders should express to the public the significance of international finance institutions (IFIs), like the Bretton Woods Institutions, and how important it was for their prominence in the world to be maintained. After the 1944 Bretton Woods Conference, the International Monetary Fund and World Bank were established; they are now often referred to as "Bretton Woods Institutions".

The original goal of the Committee was to improve the awareness of the World Bank, International Monetary Fund, World Trade Organization, and other major development banks and their actions to accelerate economic growth, lessen poverty, and increase financial stability, along with demonstrating the importance of international economic cooperation and fostering collaboration among institutions.

The Committee is described as being nonpartisan and composed of notable individuals, more specifically members of the Committee who claim to work and agree upon the significance of international economic synergy which in their view results in well-functioning, adept Bretton Woods Institutions that move to create universal economic progress.

Activities 
The Committee is based in Washington, D.C., and continues to host events relevant to the shared interests of its members at various academic institutions, government establishments, such as Capitol Hill, the U.S. Department of State, the IMF and related locations pertaining to their goals.

Meetings and events 
The Committee regularly holds events at various locations related to their goals in spreading awareness of major IFIs, including an Annual Meeting, the International Council Meeting, educational briefings, round table discussions, events at academic institutions and related events. The two purposes of these events is to first reach a general audience regarding the current actions of the IFIs and the magnitude they have on the global economy. The second is to give members an opportunity to share their opinions and critiques of current management of the IFIs. The Committee in addition informs U.S. government officials of the presumed correlation between global economic advancement and national security.

Members 
The Committee is composed of financiers, economists, politicians, business leaders and distinguished members of the academic community from the U.S. and abroad. A subsidiary of the Committee, referred to as the International Council, includes members outside of the U.S. who aim to advance and observe the work of Bretton Woods institutions and political officials of countries that council members are from/involved in, and in addition submit advice when appropriate.

Some of the current leadership/members of the Committee include:
 George H. W. Bush, Jimmy Carter and Gerald Ford, Honorary Co-Chairs
 Bill Frenzel, Co-Chair
 James Wolfensohn, Co-Chair
 Jimmy Carter, Honorary Co-Chair
 Richard A. Debs, Executive Committee Chair
 James C. Orr, Secretary
 David Miliband
 Henry Kissinger
 Colin Powell
 George Soros
 Paul Volcker

References

External links 
 
 Bretton Woods Committee at Vimeo
 Reinventing Bretton Wods

1983 establishments in the United States
International finance institutions